The Way We Were is a 1973 American romantic drama film directed by Sydney Pollack and starring Barbra Streisand and Robert Redford. Arthur Laurents wrote both the novel and screenplay based on his college days at Cornell University and his experiences with the House Un-American Activities Committee.

A box-office success, the film was nominated for several awards and won the Academy Awards for Best Original Dramatic Score and Best Original Song for the theme song "The Way We Were". It ranked at number six on AFI's 100 Years...100 Passions survey of the top 100 greatest love stories in American cinema. The Way We Were is considered one of the great romantic films.

The soundtrack album became a gold record and hit the Top 20 on the Billboard 200, while the title song became a gold single, topping the Billboard Hot 100 and selling more than two million copies. Billboard named "The Way We Were" as the number 1 pop hit of 1974. In 1998, the song was inducted into the Grammy Hall of Fame and finished at number eight on the American Film Institute's 100 Years... 100 Songs list of top tunes in American cinema in 2004. It also was included in the list of Songs of the Century, by the Recording Industry Association of America and the National Endowment for the Arts.

Plot
Told partly in flashback, it is the story of Katie Morosky and Hubbell Gardiner. Their differences are immense; she is a stridently vocal Marxist Jew with strong anti-war opinions, and he is a carefree WASP with no particular political bent. While attending the same college in 1937, she is drawn to him because of his good looks and natural writing skill, although he does not work very hard at it. He is intrigued by her conviction and determination to persuade others to take up social causes. Their attraction is evident, but neither acts upon it, and they lose touch after graduation.

The two meet again towards the end of World War II while Katie is working at a radio station, and Hubbell, having served as a naval officer in the South Pacific, is trying to adjust to stateside life. They fall in love, despite their differences. Soon, however, Katie is incensed by the cynical jokes that Hubbell's friends make at the death of President Franklin D. Roosevelt. She's unable to understand his indifference towards their insensitivity and dismissal of political engagement. At the same time, his serenity is disturbed by her lack of social graces and her polarizing postures. Hubbell breaks it off with Katie, but she pursues him and they eventually reconcile.

When Hubbell is offered the opportunity to adapt his novel into a screenplay, Katie believes he will waste his talent if he goes to Hollywood. Despite her frustration, they move to California where, without much effort, he becomes a successful screenwriter and the couple enjoy an affluent lifestyle. As the Hollywood blacklist grows and McCarthyism encroaches on their lives, Katie's political activism resurfaces, jeopardizing Hubbell's position and reputation. Eventually, Katie and other Hollywood liberals dare to confront the government's invasion of their privacy and the oppression of their right to free speech. This leads to a fight in which Hubbell claims people are what matter, not an ultimately pointless battle over principles. Katie counters that people are their principles.

Hubbell is alienated by Katie's persistent abrasiveness and, although she is now pregnant, he has brief liaison with Carol Ann, his college girlfriend recently divorced from J.J., his best friend. After the birth of their daughter, Katie and Hubbell divorce. She finally understands he's not the man she idealized, and he will always choose the easiest way out. Hubbell, for his part, is exhausted and unable to live on the pedestal that Katie erected for him.

Years later, Katie and Hubbell meet by chance in front of the Plaza Hotel in New York City. Hubbell is with a stylishly beautiful woman, and he's writing for a television show. Katie has remarried, and she invites Hubbell and his lady friend to come for a drink, but he  turns her down. Hubbell asks about their daughter Rachel, and whether Katie's new husband is a good father to her. Katie has remained faithful to who she is, and her new political cause is to "Ban the Bomb." Hubbell takes a flyer from her, says, "See you, kid," and walks back to the waiting taxi.

Katie's and Hubbell's relationship is far behind them, and all the two share now (besides their daughter) is the memory of the way they were.

Cast

 Barbra Streisand as Katie Morosky
 Robert Redford as Hubbell Gardiner
 Bradford Dillman as J.J.
 Lois Chiles as Carol Ann
 Patrick O'Neal as George Bissinger
 Viveca Lindfors as Paula Reisner
 Allyn Ann McLerie as Rhea Edwards
 Murray Hamilton as Brooks Carpenter
 Herb Edelman as Bill Verso
 Diana Ewing as Vicki Bissinger
 Sally Kirkland as Pony Dunbar
 George Gaynes as El Morocco Captain
 James Woods as Frankie McVeigh
 Susan Blakely as Judianne

Production
In 1937, while an undergraduate at Cornell, Arthur Laurents was introduced to political activism by a student who became the model for Katie Morosky, a member of the Young Communist League and an outspoken opponent of Francisco Franco and his effort to take control of Spain via the Spanish Civil War. The fiery campus radical organized rallies and a peace strike, and the memory of her fervour remained with Laurents long after the two lost touch.

Laurents decided to develop a story with a similar character at its centre, but was unsure what other elements to add. He recalled a creative writing instructor named Robert E. Short, who felt he had a good ear for dialogue and had encouraged him to write plays. His first instinct was to create a crisis between his leading lady and her college professor, but he decided her passion needed to be politics, not writing. What evolved was a male character who had a way with words, but no strong inclination to apply himself to a career using them.

Because of his own background, Laurents felt it was important for his heroine to be Jewish and share his outrage at injustice. He also thought it was time a mainstream Hollywood film had a Jewish heroine, and because Barbra Streisand was the industry's most notable Jewish star, he wrote the role of Katie Morosky for her. Laurents had known Streisand for some time, having cast her in his 1962 Broadway musical I Can Get It for You Wholesale. Hubbell Gardiner, initially a secondary character, was drawn from several people Laurents knew. The first name was borrowed from urbane television producer Hubbell Robinson, who had hired Laurents to write an episode of ABC Stage 67. The looks and personality came from two primary sources - writer Peter Viertel and a man Laurents referred to only as "Tony Blue Eyes", an acquaintance who inspired the scene where the creative writing instructor reads Hubbell's short story to his class.

Laurents wrote a lengthy treatment for Ray Stark, who read it on a transcontinental flight and called the screenwriter the moment he arrived in Los Angeles to greenlight the project. Laurents had been impressed with They Shoot Horses, Don't They? and suggested Sydney Pollack to direct. Streisand was impressed that he had studied with Sanford Meisner at the Neighborhood Playhouse in Manhattan and seconded the choice. Stark was less enthusiastic, but agreed because Pollack assured him he could deliver Robert Redford for the role of Hubbell, which Laurents had written with Ryan O'Neal in mind. O'Neal's affair with Streisand was at its end, and Stark wanted to avoid conflicts between the leads.

Laurents ultimately regretted recommending Pollack. The director demanded the role of Hubbell be made equal to that of Katie and throughout filming, for unexplained reasons, he kept Laurents away from Redford. What was intended to be the final draft of the screenplay was written by Laurents and Pollack at Stark's condominium in Sun Valley, Idaho. Laurents, dismayed to discover very little of his work remained when it was completed, left the project. Over time, 11 writers, including Dalton Trumbo, Alvin Sargent, Paddy Chayefsky, and Herb Gardner, contributed to the script. The end result was a garbled story filled with holes that neither Streisand nor Redford liked. Laurents was asked to return and did so only after demanding and receiving an exorbitant amount of money.

Because the film's start date was delayed while it underwent numerous rewrites, Cornell was lost as a shooting location, as was Williams College, where the novel The Graduate had been written 10 years earlier. Union College in Schenectady, New York, was used, instead. Other locations included the village of Ballston Spa in upstate New York; Central Park; the beach in Malibu, California; and Union Station in Los Angeles, the latter for a scene Laurents felt was absurd and fought to have deleted, without success.

Laurents was horrified when he saw the first rough cut of the film. He thought it had a few good scenes, and some good moments in bad scenes, but overall, he thought it was a badly photographed, jumbled mess lacking coherence. Both stars appeared to be playing themselves more often than their characters, and Streisand often used a grand accent that Laurents felt hurt her performance. Pollack admitted the film was not good, accepted full responsibility for its problems, and apologised for his behaviour. The following day, he retreated to the editing room to improve it as much as possible. Laurents felt the changes made it better, but never as good as it could have been.

A decade after the film was released, Redford, having made peace with Laurents, contacted him to discuss the possibility of collaborating on a new project and eventually the two settled on a sequel to The Way We Were. In it, Hubbell and his daughter, a radical like Katie, would meet, but be unaware of their relationship, and complications would ensue. Both agreed they did not want Pollack to be part of the equation. Laurents sent Redford the completed script, but aside from receiving a brief note acknowledging the actor had received it and looked forward to reading it, he never heard from him again. In 1982, Pollack approached Laurents about a sequel Stark had proposed, but nothing transpired following their initial discussion. In 1996, Streisand came across the sequel Laurents had written and decided she wanted to produce and direct it, as well as co-star with Redford, but did not want to work with Stark. Laurents thought the script was not as good as he remembered it being and agreed to rewrite it once Stark agreed to sell the rights to the characters and their story to Streisand. Again, nothing happened. The following year, Stark asked Laurents if he were interested in adapting the original film for a stage musical starring Kathie Lee Gifford. Laurents declined and any new projects related to the film have been in limbo.

Soundtrack

The musical score for The Way We Were was composed by Marvin Hamlisch. A soundtrack album was released in January 1974 to much success. At the time of its initial release, the album peaked at number 20 on the Billboard 200. On October 19, 1993, it was re-released on CD by Sony. It includes Streisand's rendition of "The Way We Were", which at the time of the film's release was a commercial success and her first number-one single in the United States. It entered the Billboard Hot 100 in November 1973 and charted for 23 weeks, eventually selling over a million copies and was number one for three non-consecutive weeks in February 1974. On the Adult Contemporary chart, it was Streisand's second top hit, following "People" a decade earlier. It was the title track of a Streisand album that reached number one.

Reception
In North America, the film was a massive commercial success, grossing  $49,919,870. It was the fifth-high-grossing film of the year, earning an estimated $10 million in North American rentals in 1973, and a total of $22,457,000 in its theatrical run.

Critical response
The Way We Were was featured on the Top Ten Films of 1973 by the National Board of Review. Roger Ebert of the Chicago Sun-Times gave the film three stars out of four and called it "essentially just a love story, and not sturdy enough to carry the burden of both radical politics and a bittersweet ending." He added "It's easy to forgive the movie a lot because of Streisand. She's fantastic. She's the brightest, quickest female in movies today, inhabiting her characters with a fierce energy and yet able to be touchingly vulnerable...The Redford character perhaps in reaction to the inevitable Streisand performance, is passive and without edges. The primary purpose of the character is to provide someone into whose life Streisand can enter and then leave. That's sort of thankless, but Redford handles it well." Ebert further added "Instead, inexplicably, the movie suddenly and implausibly has them fall out of love - and they split up without resolving anything, particularly the plot." Gene Siskel of the Chicago Tribune gave the film two-and-a-half stars out of four and wrote that "with Streisand as the film's intellectual mouthpiece—and listen, as a singer, God bless her—there is no way that the film's ideas are going to come off as anything but patronizing and tinged with comedy."
 
In her review, Pauline Kael noted, "the decisive change in the characters' lives which the story hinges on takes place suddenly and hardly makes sense." She was not the only critic to question the gap in the plot. Of the scene in the hospital shortly after Katie gives birth and they part indefinitely, Molly Haskell wrote, "She seems to know all about it, but it came as a complete shock to me." The sloppy editing was exposed in other ways, as well. In his review, critic John Simon wrote: "Some things, I suppose, never change, like the necktie Redford wears in two scenes that take place many years apart."

Variety called it "a distended, talky, redundant, and moody melodrama" and adds, "but Robert Redford has too little to work with in the script," and "The overemphasis on Streisand makes the film just another one of those Streisand vehicles where no other elements ever get a chance." Time Out London observed "[W]ith the script glossing whole areas of confrontation (from the Communist '30s to the McCarthy witch-hunts), it often passes into the haze of a nostalgic fashion parade. Although Streisand's liberated Jewish lady is implausible, and emphasises the period setting as just so much dressing, Redford's Fitzgerald-type character...is an intriguing trailer for his later Great Gatsby. It's a performance that brings more weight to the film than it deserves, often hinting at depths that are finally skated over."

Conversely, TV Guide awarded the film three out of four stars, calling it "an engrossing, if occasionally ludicrous, hit tearjerker" and "a great campy romance."

As of January 2023, the film holds a rating of 64% on Rotten Tomatoes based on 33 reviews. The consensus states: "The Way We Were isn't politically confrontational enough for its story of ideological opposites falling in love to feel authentic, but Barbra Streisand and Robert Redford's beaming star power gives this melodrama romantic lift."

Awards and nominations

In popular culture
In Gilda Radner's concert film Gilda Live, her character Lisa Loopner performs "The Way We Were" on the piano. Loopner says of the film "It's about a Jewish woman with a big nose and her blond boyfriend who move to Hollywood, and it's during the blacklist and it puts a strain on their relationship."

The Simpsons had three episodes, one called "The Way We Was" (first aired in 1991), "The Way We Weren't" (first aired in 2004), and "The Wayz We Were" (first aired in 2021), although their plots are unrelated to the film.

In season one of Gilmore Girls, Lorelei attempts to guess Dean's darkest secret is that he secretly wanted Robert Redford to dump his wife and children for Barbra Streisand. Dean admits that he has not seen The Way We Were. In another episode of Gilmore Girls, Lorelei tells Sookie that she is reminded of The Way We Were because she hid from Luke the fact that she had lunch with Christopher. In season five of Gilmore Girls, Lorelei calls Luke after they have broken up and tells him that she was thinking about The Way We Were and reminded him of how Katie called Hubbell after they had broken up and asked him to come sit with her because he was her best friend and she needed her best friend.

On the show Friends, Rachel Green lists The Way We Were as the most romantic movie of all time.

In That '70s Show, Kitty Forman says that The Way We Were was a nice film after Eric explains a scene in Star Wars.

In Sex and the City, Carrie uses The Way We Were as an analogy for her relationship with Big. The girls proceed to sing the film's theme song, and later, when Carrie bumps into Big outside his engagement party, she quotes a line from the film.

In the movie The Jerk, Marie (Bernadette Peters) is sobbing over the demise of her relationship while a drunk Navin Johnson (Steve Martin) is writing checks for $1.09. He is badgering her and asks why she is crying and why she is wearing an old dress from one of their very first meetings. She responds "Because I just heard a song on the radio that reminded me of the way we were." "What was it?" he asks. She sobs in reply, "The Way We Were."

In a season one episode of the sitcom The King of Queens, Doug and Richie contemplate watching The Way We Were on the "Romance Channel," because there was nothing else on during daytime TV.

See also
 List of American films of 1973

Notes

References

External links

 
 
 
 
 
 McCarthyism and the Movies The Way We Were (1973)
 Barbra Archives: The Way We Were cut scenes and song demos

1973 films
1973 romantic drama films
American romantic drama films
Columbia Pictures films
Films scored by Marvin Hamlisch
Films about the Hollywood blacklist
Films directed by Sydney Pollack
Films set in the 1930s
Films set in the 1940s
Films set in the 1950s
Films set in California
Films set in New York (state)
Films that won the Best Original Song Academy Award
Films that won the Best Original Score Academy Award
American interfaith romance films
Films with screenplays by Arthur Laurents
1970s English-language films
1970s American films